Cowley County may refer to:
 Cowley County, Kansas
 Cowley County, New South Wales